Congestheriella is an extinct genus of fossil branchiopods in the order Spinicaudata.

References 

 Gallego O.F., Shen, Y.B., Cabaleri N.G. and Hernández M. 2010: The genus Congestheriella Kobayashi, 1954 (Conchostraca, Afrograptioidea): redescription and new combination to Isaura olsoni Bock from Venezuela and a new species from Argentina (Upper Jurassic). Alavesia, 3, pages 11–24
 Spinicaudatans from the Upper Jurassic of Argentina and their paleoenvironments. Mateo D. Monferran, Nora G. Cabaleri, Oscar F. Gallego, Claudia Armella and Mariana Cagnoni, Palaios, 2016, 
 A new afrograptid (Diplostraca: Estheriellina) from the Lower Cretaceous of southern England. Huanyu Liao, Oscar F. Gallego, Yanbin Shen, Edmund A. Jarzembowski and Diying Huang, Cretaceous Research, Volume 71, March 2017, Pages 79–84,

External links 

Branchiopoda genera
Prehistoric crustacean genera
Spinicaudata